Dar ol Mizan (also Romanized as Dār ol Mīzān and Dārolmīzān) is a village in Dasht-e Laleh Rural District, Asir District, Mohr County, Fars Province, Iran. At the 2006 census, its population was 652, in 134 families.

References 

Populated places in Mohr County